Boromo  is a department of Balé Province in southern Burkina Faso. Its capital is the town of Boromo. According to the 2019 census the department has a population of 40,228.

Towns and villages
Towns and villages and populations in the department are as follows:

 Boromo	(11 694 inhabitants) (capital)
 Koho	(1 903 inhabitants)
 Lapara	(2 648 inhabitants)
 Nanou	(2 376 inhabitants)
 Ouahabou	(5 601 inhabitants)
 Ouako	(842 inhabitants)
 Ouroubono	(1 511 inhabitants)
 Siguinoguin	(1 407 inhabitants)
 Virou	(1 001 inhabitants)

References

Departments of Burkina Faso
Balé Province

it:Boromo
vi:Boromo